An anti-social behaviour order (ASBO ) is a civil order made in Great Britain against a person who had been shown, on the balance of evidence, to have engaged in anti-social behaviour. The orders were introduced by Prime Minister Tony Blair in 1998, and continued in use until repealed in England and Wales by the Anti-Social Behaviour, Crime and Policing Act 2014 on 20 October 2014—although they continue to be used in Scotland. ASBOs were replaced in England and Wales by the civil injunctions and the criminal behaviour orders. They were designed to address behaviours like intimidation, drunkenness, and violence by individuals and families, using civil orders rather than criminal sanctions. The orders restricted behaviour in some way, such as: prohibiting a return to a certain area or shop; or restricting public behaviours, such as swearing or drinking alcohol. Many saw the ASBOs as connected with young delinquents.

They are closely related to the fixed penalty notices and related schemes such as penalty notices for disorder (PNDs) and penalty charge notices (PCNs), in both intent and date of introduction.

History
ASBOs were introduced in England, Scotland, and Wales through the Crime and Disorder Act 1998. Later legislation strengthened its application: in England and Wales, this was largely via the Anti-social Behaviour Act 2003; in Northern Ireland through an Order in Council; and in Scotland with the Antisocial and Sexual Behaviour etc. (Scotland) Act 2004. Scotland, however, had a pre-existing tribunal system charged with dealing with children and young persons who offend, the Children's Hearings system.

In a press release of 28 October 2004, Tony Blair and David Blunkett announced further measures to extend the use and definition of ASBOs. The remit included:
 Extension of the Witness Protection Programme in anti-social behaviour cases
 More courts dealing with cases
 More offences, including dog-fouling, litter, graffiti, and night-time noise liable for fixed penalty notices
 Giving parish councils the power to issue fixed penalty notices for infringements

The press release concluded by remarking:

On 25 October 2005, Transport for London announced its intent to apply for a new law giving them the authority to issue orders against repeat fare dodgers, and increased fines. By 31 March 2004, 2,455 ASBOs had been issued in England and Wales. On 30 March 2006, the Home Office announced that 7,356 ABSOs had been given out since 1999 in England and Wales.

Replacement 

The 2010 coalition government expressed its intention to replace ASBOs, citing the reasons that "breach rates are high, and the number issued has been steadily declining since 2005." In July 2010, Home Secretary Theresa May announced her intention to reform anti-social behaviour measures for England and Wales, with the abolition of ASBOs in due course in favour of alternative "community-based" social control policies. However, in 2012, Liberal Democrat objections prevented the implementation of proposals in a Home Office White Paper to replace the ASBO with a "criminal behaviour order" and a "crime prevention injunction". In May 2013, an Anti-social Behaviour, Crime and Policing Bill was introduced into the House of Commons, including a provision to create "injunctions to prevent nuisance and annoyance", replacing ASBOs in England and Wales. The bill was criticised for the broad and undefined scope of "nuisance and annoyance", and was rejected by the House of Lords in January 2014.

The Anti-Social Behaviour, Crime and Policing Act 2014 received Royal Assent in March 2014. This streamlined the tools available to tackle anti-social behaviour, and replaced the ASBO with an injunction (a civil order) and a criminal behaviour order (CBO).

What warranted an ASBO

Uses

An ASBO was issued in response to "conduct which caused or was likely to cause harm, harassment, alarm, or distress, to one or more persons not of the same household as him or herself, and where an ASBO was seen as necessary to protect relevant persons from further anti-social acts by the defendant." In England and Wales, they were issued by magistrates' courts, and in Scotland by the sheriff courts.

The British government introduced ASBOs through the Crime and Disorder Act 1998. In the UK, a CRASBO was a "criminally related" ASBO. One local authority published photos of those given ASBOs on an Internet site. Anti-social behaviour included a range of problems, such as:

 abandoning cars
 arson
 begging
 casteism
 dangerous driving
 defecating/urinating in public
 disturbing the peace
 dogging (exhibitionistic public sex)
 drug dealing/consumption of controlled recreational drugs
 drunken behaviour
 fare evasion
 intimidation
 littering/fly tipping/dog fouling
 loitering (with intent)
 noise pollution
 paedophilic activity
 racism and xenophobia
 rioting
 rudeness
 smoking in public places
 spitting
 stealing/mugging/shoplifting
 urban exploration
 vandalism/criminal damage/graffiti

Standard of proof
Applications for ASBOs were heard by magistrates sitting in their civil capacity. Although the proceedings were civil, the court had to apply a heightened civil standard of proof. This standard was virtually indistinguishable from the criminal standard. The applicant had to satisfy the court "so that it is sure" that the defendant has acted in an anti-social manner. The test for the court to be "satisfied so that it is sure" was the same direction that a judge gives to a jury in a criminal case heard in the Crown Court, and is also known as satisfying the court "beyond reasonable doubt".

Pursuant to section 1(1) Civil Evidence Act 1995, an applicant (and a defendant) had the right to rely on witness statements without calling the makers of those statements—known as hearsay. If a party proposed to rely upon a hearsay statement, then the other party was entitled to ask the court for permission to call that witness for cross-examination.

If the court refused to grant such an application, then the defendant would  be unable to cross examine the makers of the hearsay statements. Nevertheless, it was open to them, in accordance with the Civil Evidence Act, to submit that the court should place little or no weight upon material that had not been tested by way of cross examination.

Section 4(1) Civil Evidence Act 1995 states that:

The High Court has emphasised that the use of the words "if any" shows that some hearsay evidence may be given no weight at all. For an ASBO to be made, the applicant had to prove beyond all reasonable doubt that the respondent had behaved in an anti-social manner. The applicant could rely on hearsay evidence. However, the Court of Appeal has stated that it does not expect a court to find that the criminal standard has been reached by relying solely on hearsay evidence. The Civil Evidence Act 1995 itself makes clear that courts should consider what weight, if any at all, attaches to hearsay material. In Cleary, the Court of Appeal again restated that courts should consider attaching no weight at all to such material, in accordance with the words of the statute.

It is for the court to decide what weight to give the hearsay evidence. The Court of Appeal has stated that the high standard of proof is difficult to meet if the entirety of the case, or the majority of it, is based upon hearsay evidence. The proper approach would be for a court to consider to what extent the hearsay evidence is, amongst other things, supported by other evidence, the cogency and similarity of supporting instances of hearsay evidence, and the cogency and reliability of contradictory evidence supplied by a defendant.

Where, for example, ten anonymous witnesses who are unrelated to each other each provide a witness statement as to the defendant's anti-social behaviour, where each statement refers independently to the same particular events, and where this is supported by a witness statement from a non-anonymous witness, such as a housing officer who confirms that residents have made complaints about a particular person over a period of time, then the court may be justified in according to the statements a fair degree of weight.

Typical ASBOs
An ABSO was an order of the court which told an individual aged over 10 years how they must not behave.

An order could contain only negative prohibitions. It could not contain a positive obligation. To obtain an ASBO, a two-stage test had to be satisfied by the applicant authority (see: s.1(1) Crime and Disorder Act 1998). The first test was that the defendant had committed acts causing or likely to cause harassment, alarm, or distress within six months of the date of issue of the summons. The second test was that an order was necessary to protect persons from further anti-social behaviour.

The applicant had to satisfy the court that the individual had acted in an anti-social manner—that is to say, in a manner that caused, or was likely to cause, harassment, alarm, or distress to one or more persons not of the same household as themself. A court could order an ASBO only if such an order was "necessary". Further, each prohibited act would usually be an act preparatory to a criminal offence, rather than the offence itself—but not always (see: Rabess v Commissioner of Police of the Metropolis [2007] EWHC 208 (Admin)). In addition, each prohibition itself had to be necessary. 

An order had to be tailor-made for the individual defendant. The ASBO represented "a form of personalised criminal law." It had to be relevant to their particular anti-social behaviour. Orders should not have been drafted too widely or imprecisely. Each prohibition had to be necessary.

An ASBO was very similar to a civil injunction, even though the differences are important. First: the injunction was supposed to protect the world at large, in a given geographical area, rather than an individual. Second: breach of an ASBO was a criminal offence to be tried in a criminal court, applying the criminal standard of beyond all reasonable doubt. A power of committal to prison was available for breach of a civil injunction, but a court was unlikely to exercise that power. A person subject to an anti-social behaviour order where it did not follow a criminal conviction had an automatic right of appeal against both the making of the order and its terms to a higher court. There was also the availability of an appeal to the High Court by way of "case stated". There was no appeal against the variation of orders, and variation was used to add extra conditions, and to extend the duration of ASBOs.

An application for an ASBO was considered by the courts in its civil jurisdiction, and was a civil order. However, breach of an ASBO was a criminal offence, and conviction could result in up to five years' imprisonment (two for a minor). Subsequent legislation compelled magistrates to make a Parenting Order, where a person under the age of 16 breached their ASBO.

Other examples:
 Abusive behaviour
 Begging
 Flyposting
 Harassment
 Organising illegal raves
 Suicide attempts
 Theft
 Vandalism

Less common ASBOs

Less common and more conventional uses of ASBOs, as listed by a report to the Home Office to illustrate the difficulties with ASBOs, include:
 Two teenage boys from east Manchester forbidden to wear one golf glove, as it was a symbol of membership of a particular gang.
 A 13-year-old forbidden to use the word "grass" as a term of abuse in order to threaten people.
 A 15-year-old forbidden to play football in his street.
 A farmer (the first to be given an ASBO) who was instructed to keep his geese and pigs from damaging his neighbour's property.
 An 18-year-old ordered not to congregate with three or more other youths. He entered a local youth club that had a good reputation, and was arrested because there were more than three youths on the premises. He was intending to attend an event there on how to deal with anti-social behaviour.

Reception

From their inception, ASBOs were controversial. They were criticised as being "without strong and principled justification", a distraction from the failure of the government's law and order policies, a "recipe for institutionalised vigilantism", and an "emblem of punitive populism". Andrew Rutherford commented that the "ASBO provides a particularly striking example of the criminalisation of social policy". A MORI opinion poll published on 9 June 2005 found that 82% of the British public were in favour of ASBOs; however, only 39% believed they were effective in their current form. A 2012 survey by Angus Reid Public Opinion showed that only 8% of Britons believed ASBOs had been successful in curbing anti-social behaviour in the UK.

Other parties voiced concerns about the open-ended nature of ASBO penalties—that is, there was little restriction on what a court was able to impose as the terms of the ASBO, and little restriction on what could be designated as antisocial behaviour. In 2005, critics reported that only around 3% of ASBO applications had been turned down. In July 2007, the Local Government Ombudsman published a report criticising Manchester City Council for serving an ASBO based purely on uncorroborated reports of nuisance by a neighbour, and the Council agreed to pay £2000 in compensation.

A 2005 memorandum submitted by the National Association of Probation Officers (NAPO) asserted that "there is ample evidence of the issuing of ASBOs by the courts being inconsistent and almost a geographical lottery. There is great concern that people are being jailed following the breach of an ASBO, where the original offence was itself non-imprisonable. There is also evidence that ASBOs have been used where people have mental health problems where treatment would be more appropriate. In NAPO's view, the time is right for a fundamental review of the use and appropriateness of Anti-social Behaviour Orders by the Home Office."

In 2002, Home Office data stated that in the cases where information was available, there was a high proportion where some mitigating factor appeared to have contributed to their behaviour. Overall, 44% were engaging in substance use or had a learning disability, and a further 16% included persons with psychological and behaviour problems in the family. Similar results were found in Scotland. A casefile review showed that 55% of those given ASBOs had substance use disorders, mental health, or learning disability problems (see: The Use of ASBOs in Scotland, H. Pawson, School of The Built Environment, Heriot-Watt University, Edinburgh, 2007).

In 2005, a survey of Youth Offending Teams by the British Institute for Brain Injured Children showed that 38% of ASBOs went to young people with significant mental disorders. Problems included: clinical depression, suicidal tendencies, autism, psychosis, personality disorders, learning disabilities, and ADHD; this raised the question of whether young people with these illnesses should be held to a lower standard of behaviour than others. By contrast, the same survey of ASBO teams gave only a 5% reported incidence of mental impairment. This massive difference suggests that most ASBO teams did not take into account mental health problems, even though the Home Office safeguards for vulnerable people in the ASBO process required it.

ASBO effectiveness was also questioned. In response to a House of Commons question, it was stated that 53.7% of ASBOs were breached in England in 2005; 69.4% in 2006; and 70.3% in 2007. In large cities, rates could be higher: the breach rate in Manchester reached 90.2% in 2007. This level of breaching raised an interesting issue. The first test to justify the issuing of an ASBO was that anti-social behaviour (ASB) had been proved to the criminal standard. The second test was that the order was necessary to prevent future acts of ASB, and provide protection to the victim(s). However, the criminal standard was not applied to the second test. Indeed, Lord Steyn stated:

According to government evaluations (e.g. Housing Research Summary No. 230; DfCLG) in the "ASB Intensive Family Support" (Sin Bin) projects introduced to supplement ASBOs, 80% of the families targeted had serious mental/physical health and learning disability problems; one in five families had children affected with attention deficit hyperactivity disorder, and 60% of the families were recognised as victims of ASB. Project managers described many families as "easily scapegoated" in neighbour disputes. HRS 230 called for a review of both ASBO policy and investigation procedures in order to make the whole process fairer.

A later study of 53 projects by the National Centre For Social Research noted that 42% of children with mental health problems were reported to have ADHD or hyperactivity, and 29% were reported with depression or stress. Amongst adults, 69% had depression.

A later comprehensive review of Family Intervention Projects over a decade found little objective evidence for significant, sustained reduction in ASB in the families, and concluded that underlying mental health and disability problems remained largely unaddressed.

In the UK, there was criticism that an ASBO was sometimes viewed as a badge of honour by the youth.

Nacro, the biggest criminal justice-related charity in England and Wales, published two reports: the first claimed that ASBOs were a failure, due to being costly and slow to obtain; and the second criticised their use by the courts, with assertions that they were being used too hastily, before alternatives had been tried.

See also

References

Further reading
 

 HMSO.gov.uk – Crime and Disorder Act 1998 (introduced ASBOs), Office of Public Sector Information
 HMSO.gov.uk – Anti-social Behaviour Act 2003, Office of Public Sector Information

Law of the United Kingdom
Anti-social behaviour
Court orders